Hibernian may refer to:

 Of Hibernia, Latin name for Ireland; hence
 Irish (disambiguation)

Hibernian, Hibernians or The Hibernian may refer to:

Sports clubs 
 Hibernian F.C., a Scottish football club, founded 1875
 Hibernian W.F.C., a Scottish women's football club, founded 1999, affiliated with Hibernian F.C.
 Hibernians F.C., a Maltese football club, founded 1922
 Cambuslang Hibernian F.C., a Scottish football club, active 1884–1908
 Cork Hibernians F.C., an Irish soccer club, active 1957–1977
 Dundee Hibernian F.C., a Scottish football club, founded 1909 (renamed Dundee United in 1923)
 Duntocher Hibernian F.C., a Scottish football club, active 1894–1980
 Maryhill Hibernians F.C., a Scottish football club, active 1923–1967 (renamed Maryhill Harp in 1939)
 Navan Hibernians GAC, an Irish hurling club active in 1902
 Philadelphia Hibernian, an American soccer club, active 1909–1921
 Seattle Hibernian, an American soccer club, successively named  Seattle FC (1995), Seattle Hibernian (1996-2004), Hibernian & Caledonian (2005), and Hibernian Saints (2006).

Finance 
 Hibernian Bank Ltd, absorbed by the Bank of Ireland in 1958
 Hibernian Aviva, an Irish insurance company
 Hibernian Catholic Benefit Society, a New Zealand friendly society and formerly, an associated credit union
 Los Angeles Hibernian Bank, American bank sold in 1988 to Security Pacific

Other uses 
 Ancient Order of Hibernians, an Irish Catholic fraternal organization based in the United States
 Hibernian (album), a 1995 release by Irish band Tír na nÓg
 Hibernian Orchestra, orchestra founded in Dublin in 1981
 Hibernian Magazine (disambiguation)

See also
 Hibernia (disambiguation)
 Hibernian Hall (disambiguation)